Seiches-sur-le-Loir (literally Seiches on the Loir) is a commune in the Maine-et-Loire department in western France. It is around 20 km north-east of Angers.

See also
Communes of the Maine-et-Loire department

References

Seichessurleloir
Anjou